Nanninga is a surname. Notable people with the surname include:

 Annabel Nanninga (born 1977), Dutch politician and journalist
 Dick Nanninga (1949–2015), Dutch footballer
 Rob Nanninga (1955–2014), Dutch writer
 thijmen nanninga (born 2005), dutch person 
\